The Type 89 torpedo (development name G-RX2) is a Japanese submarine-launched homing torpedo produced by Mitsubishi Heavy Industries. It replaced the unguided Type 72 torpedo. Development was done by the Technical Research and Development Institute, a department of the Ministry of Defense, and began in 1970, with the design completed by 1984. Developed from the Type 80 torpedo, it is similar in its capabilities to the United States Mark 48 ADCAP torpedo. After being formally approved in 1989 and named "Type 89", it entered service and is currently carried aboard the  Oyashio, and Sōryū class submarines. It was also carried by the Yuushio and  Harushio class submarine before they were retired from active service in 2006 and 2017 respectively.

It is a wire-guided torpedo that features both active and passive homing modes. Compared to Mk-48 (ADCAP) torpedo, it is slightly longer (6.25 m to 5.79 m) and heavier (1,760 kg to 1,676 kg), but has a smaller warhead (267 kg to 295 kg). However, it can be used at a greater depth (900 m vs. 800 m for the Mk-48).

The successor to the Type 89 torpedo was developed under the development name "G-RX6" and officially named Type 18 torpedo (ja) in 2018. The Taigei-class submarine is equipped with a number of Type 18 torpedoes.

Specifications
 Length: 6,250 mm (20.51 ft)
 Weight: 1,760 kg (3,900 lb)
 Diameter: 533 mm (21 in)
 Warhead: 267 kg (590 lb)
 Speed:  maximum possibly 
 Operating depth: 900 m

References

 Jane's Underwater Warfare Systems 2006-2007.

Torpedoes of Japan
Post–Cold War weapons of Japan
Type 89
Military equipment introduced in the 1980s